Merulius is a genus of poroid fungi in the family Meruliaceae. , Index Fungorum accepts two species in Merulius: M. debriscola, and the type, M. tremellosus.

References

Meruliaceae
Taxa named by Elias Magnus Fries
Polyporales genera
Fungi described in 1821